Sulfuryl chloride is an inorganic compound with the formula SO2Cl2.  At room temperature, it is a colorless liquid with a pungent odor.  Sulfuryl chloride is not found in nature, as can be inferred from its rapid hydrolysis.

Sulfuryl chloride is commonly confused with thionyl chloride, SOCl2.  The properties of these two sulfur oxychlorides are quite different: sulfuryl chloride is a source of chlorine whereas thionyl chloride is a source of chloride ions. An alternative IUPAC name is sulfuroyl dichloride.

Structure
Sulfur is tetrahedral in SO2Cl2 and the oxidation state of the sulfur atom is +6, as in sulfuric acid.

Synthesis
SO2Cl2 is prepared by the reaction of sulfur dioxide and chlorine in the presence of a catalyst, such as activated carbon.
SO2  +  Cl2  →  SO2Cl2

The product can be purified by fractional distillation.

Legacy routes
Sulfuryl chloride was first prepared in 1838 by the French chemist Henri Victor Regnault.

Legacy routes include oxidation of thionyl chloride:
SOCl2  +  HgO  →  ClSSCl  +  HgCl2  +  SO2Cl2
2 SOCl2  + MnO2  →  SO2 +  MnCl2 +  SO2Cl2

Reactions
Sulfuryl chloride reacts with water, releasing hydrogen chloride gas and sulfuric acid:
2 H2O  +  SO2Cl2  →  2 HCl + H2SO4

SO2Cl2 will also decompose when heated to or above 100 °C, about 30 °C above its boiling point.

Upon standing, SO2Cl2 decomposes to sulfur dioxide and chlorine, which gives the older samples a slightly yellowish color.

SO2Cl2 can be used as a source of chlorine in alkane chlorination, initiated by chemicals (usually a peroxide) or light:

CH4  +  SO2Cl2  →  CH3Cl  +  SO2  +  HCl

Uses
Sulfuryl chloride is used as a source of Cl2.  Because it is a pourable liquid, it is considered more convenient than Cl2 to dispense.  It is used as a reagent in the conversion of C−H to C−Cl adjacent to activating substituents such as carbonyls and sulfoxides.  It also chlorinates alkanes, alkenes, alkynes, aromatics, ethers (such as tetrahydrofuran) and epoxides.  Such reactions occur under free radical conditions using an initiator such as AIBN. It can also be used to convert thiols or disulfides into their corresponding sulfenyl chlorides, though sulfinyl chlorides result from thiols in some cases.  SO2Cl2 can also convert alcohols to alkyl chlorides. In industry, sulfuryl chloride is most used in producing pesticides.

Sulfuryl chloride can also be used to treat wool to prevent shrinking.

Precautions
Sulfuryl chloride is toxic, corrosive, and acts as a lachrymator.  It releases hydrogen chloride upon contact with water, as well as donor solvents such as dimethyl sulfoxide and dimethylformamide.

See also
 Sulfuryl diazide

References

Further reading

 
 
 
 
 

Oxychlorides
Sulfuryl compounds
Sulfur oxohalides